Edwin Donald "Duke" Snider (September 19, 1926 – February 27, 2011), nicknamed "the Silver Fox" and "the Duke of Flatbush", was an American professional baseball player. Primarily a center fielder, he spent most of his Major League Baseball (MLB) career playing for the Brooklyn / Los Angeles Dodgers (1947–1962), later playing one season each for the New York Mets (1963) and San Francisco Giants (1964).

Snider was named to the National League (NL) All-Star roster eight times and was the NL Most Valuable Player (MVP) runner-up in 1955. In his 16 seasons with the Dodgers, he helped lead the team to six World Series, with victories in 1955 and 1959. He was elected to the National Baseball Hall of Fame in 1980.

Early life
Born in Los Angeles, Snider was nicknamed "Duke" by his father at age 5. Growing up in Southern California, Snider was a gifted all-around athlete, playing basketball, football, and baseball at Compton High School, class of 1944. He was a strong-armed quarterback, who reportedly could throw the football 70 yards.

Minor leagues 
Spotted by one of Branch Rickey's scouts in the early 1940s, he was signed to a baseball contract out of high school in 1943. He played briefly for the Montreal Royals of the International League in 1944 (batting twice) and for the Newport News Dodgers in the Piedmont League in the same year. After serving in the U.S. Navy in 1945 and part of 1946, he came back to play for the Fort Worth Cats that year, and also for St. Paul in 1947.

Major leagues 

Snider earned a tryout with the Brooklyn Dodgers during their spring training in 1947. He got his first major league at bat in the second Dodger's game of the 1947 season on April 17 and hit a single. He played in 39 more games that season and became a friend of Jackie Robinson before he was sent to the St. Paul team in early July. Snider returned to the Dodgers at the end of the season in time for the World Series against the New York Yankees. Snider (after spring training with the Dodgers) started the 1948 season with Montreal, and after hitting well in that league with a .327 batting average, he was called up to Brooklyn in August and played in 53 games. In 1949, Snider became a regular major leaguer hitting 23 home runs with 92 runs batted in, helping the Dodgers into the World Series. Snider also saw his average climb from .244 to .292. A more mature Snider became the "trigger man" in a power-laden lineup which boasted players Joe Black, Roy Campanella, Billy Cox, Carl Erskine, Carl Furillo, Gil Hodges, Clem Labine, Pee Wee Reese, Jackie Robinson, and Preacher Roe. Often compared with two other New York center fielders, fellow Baseball Hall of Famers, Mickey Mantle and Willie Mays, he was the reigning "Duke" of Flatbush.

In 1950, he hit .321 and led the National League with 199 base hits and 343 total bases, earning his first All-Star Game appearance. When his average slipped to .277 in 1951 (a season when the Dodgers lost a 13‑game August lead and finished second to the Giants after Bobby Thomson's "Shot Heard 'Round the World"), Snider was roundly criticized in the newspapers. Snider recalls, "I went to Walter O'Malley and told him I couldn't take the pressure", and, "I told him I'd just as soon be traded. I told him I figured I could do the Dodgers no good." The trade did not happen.

Usually batting third in the lineup, Snider established impressive offensive numbers. He hit 40 or more home runs in five consecutive seasons (1953–1957), and between 1953 and 1956 he averaged 42 home runs, 124 RBI, 123 runs, and a .320 batting average. He led the National League (NL) in runs scored, home runs, and RBI in separate seasons. He appeared in six post-seasons with the Dodgers (1949, 1952–53, 1955–56, 1959), facing the New York Yankees in the first five and the Chicago White Sox in the last. The Dodgers won the World Series in 1955 and in 1959.

Snider's career numbers declined when the team moved to Los Angeles in 1958. Coupled with an aching knee and a  right field fence at the cavernous Coliseum, Snider hit only 15 home runs in 1958. However, he had one last hurrah in 1959 as he helped the Dodgers win their first World Series in Los Angeles. Duke rebounded that year to hit .308 with 23 home runs and 88 RBI in 370 at bats while sharing fielding duties in right and center fields with Don Demeter and rookie Ron Fairly. Injuries and age would eventually play a role in reducing Snider to part-time status by 1961.

In 1962 when the Dodgers led the NL for most of the season (only to find themselves tied with the hated Giants at the season's end), it was Snider and third-base coach Leo Durocher who reportedly pleaded with manager Walter Alston to bring in future Hall of Fame pitcher (and Cy Young Award winner that year) Don Drysdale in the ninth inning of the third and deciding playoff game. Instead, Alston brought in Stan Williams to relieve a tiring Eddie Roebuck. A 4–2 lead turned into a 6–4 loss as the Giants rallied to win the pennant. Snider was subsequently sold to the New York Mets. It is said that Drysdale, his roommate, broke down and cried when he got the news of Snider's departure.

When Snider joined the Mets, he discovered that his familiar number 4 was being worn by Charlie Neal, who refused to give it up. Snider wore number 11 during the first half of the season, then switched back to 4 after Neal was traded. He proved to be a sentimental favorite among former Dodger fans who now rooted for the Mets. On April 16, 1963, Snider recorded his 2,000th hit, doing so at Crosley Field against the Cincinnati Reds on a single off Jim Maloney in the 2nd inning. On June 14, he recorded his 400th home run, once again against the Reds, doing so in the first inning off Bob Purkey. He was named to the All-Star Game in Cleveland, his eighth and final selection. He entered the game as a pinch hitter for Tommy Davis in the top of the ninth inning. Facing Dick Radatz, he struck out looking. For the season with the Mets, he appeared in 129 games while batting a slashline of .243/.345/.401, with 14 home runs, 45 RBIs, 45 walks, and 56 strikeouts. After one season, Snider asked to be traded to a contending team.

Snider was sold to the San Francisco Giants on Opening Day in 1964. Knowing that he had no chance of wearing number 4, which had been worn by Mel Ott and retired by the Giants, Snider took number 28. In 91 games played with the Giants, he batted a line of .210/.302/.323 while having four home runs and 17 RBIs. He had no triples for the first and only time in his career. He had 40 strikeouts and 22 walks. He appeared in three different positions for the Giants, playing 26 games in right field and 18 in left field for a combined total of 288.2 innings. He made 44 putouts, two assists with one error for a .979 fielding percentage. He retired at the end of that season.

He finished his major league career with a lifetime .295 batting average, 2,116 hits, 1,259 runs, 407 home runs, and 1,333 RBI. Defensively, he posted a .985 fielding percentage playing at all three outfield positions.

1955 MVP balloting controversy 
Snider finished second to teammate Roy Campanella in the 1955 Most Valuable Player (MVP) balloting conducted by the Baseball Writers' Association of America. He trailed Campanella by just five points, 226–221, with each man receiving eight first-place votes. A widely believed story, summarized in an article by columnist Tracy Ringolsby, holds that a hospitalized writer from Philadelphia had turned in a ballot with Campanella listed as his first-place and fifth-place vote. It was assumed that the writer had meant to write Snider's name into one of those slots. Unable to get a clarification from the ill writer, the BBWAA considered disallowing the ballot but decided to accept it, counting the first-place vote for Campanella and counting the fifth-place vote as though it were left blank. Had the ballot been disallowed, the vote would have been won by Snider 221–212. Had Snider gotten that now-blank fifth-place vote, the final vote would have favored Snider 227–226.

Sportswriter Joe Posnanski, however, has suggested that this story is not entirely true. Posnanski writes that there was a writer who did leave Snider off his ballot and write in Campanella's name twice, but it was in first and sixth positions, not first and fifth. Had Snider received the sixth place vote, the final tally would have created a tie, not a win for Snider. Additionally, the position wasn't discarded — everyone lower on the ballot was moved up a spot, and pitcher Jack Meyer was inserted at the bottom with a 10th place vote.

Snider did win the Sporting News National League Player of the Year Award for 1955, and the Sid Mercer Award, emblematic of his selection by the New York branch of the BBWAA as the National League's best player of 1955.

Player statistics

Later life
Following his retirement from baseball, Snider became a popular and respected TV/radio analyst and play-by-play announcer for the San Diego Padres from 1969 to 1971 and for the Montreal Expos from 1973 to 1986. He was characterized by a mellow, low-key style.

Snider occasionally took acting roles, sometimes appearing in television or films as himself or as a professional baseball player. He played himself in "Hero Father" (1956) in the Robert Young television series Father Knows Best, made one guest appearance on the Chuck Connors television series The Rifleman, and played Wallace in The Retired Gun (1959). Other appearances include an uncredited part as a Los Angeles Dodgers center fielder in The Geisha Boy (1958), the Cranker in The Trouble with Girls (1969), and a Steamer Fan in Pastime (1990). As recently as 2007, he was featured in Brooklyn Dodgers: Ghosts of Flatbush.
 
In 1995, Snider and Willie McCovey pleaded guilty to federal tax fraud charges. According to the charges, they had failed to report income from sports card shows and memorabilia sales.

Snider was featured in the 1981 song "Talkin' Baseball."

Besides his selection to the Hall of Fame in 1980, in 1999 Snider was ranked 84 on The Sporting Newss list of "100 Greatest Players", and was a nominee for the Major League Baseball All-Century Team.

Snider married Beverly Null in 1947; they had four children.

Snider died on February 27, 2011, at age 84 of an undisclosed illness at the Valle Vista Convalescent Hospital in Escondido, California. He was the last living Brooklyn Dodger who was on the field for the final out of the 1955 World Series.

In 2013, the Bob Feller Act of Valor Award honored Snider as one of 37 Baseball Hall of Fame members for his service in the United States Navy during World War II.

MLB highlights
Some of Snider's MLB achievements:
 NL All-Star (1950–1956, 1963)
 NL MVP runner-up (1955)
 NL home run leader (1956)
 NL RBI leader (1955)
 NL leader in fielding average as center fielder (1951, 1952, 1955)
 World Series champion team (1955, 1959) 
 Los Angeles Dodgers: career leader in home runs (389), RBI (1,271), strikeouts (1,123), and extra-base hits (814)
 Los Angeles Dodgers: single-season record holder for most intentional walks (26 in 1956)
 Only player to hit four home runs (or more) in two different World Series (1952, 1955)
 One of two players (besides Gil Hodges) with over 1,000 RBI during the 1950s
 Led MLB in RBI for the decade of the 1950s (1,031)
 Hit 19 home runs off of Robin Roberts; the all-time record for most home runs off of a single pitcher

Books

See also
 List of Major League Baseball career home run leaders
 List of Major League Baseball career hits leaders
 List of Major League Baseball career runs scored leaders
 List of Major League Baseball career runs batted in leaders
 List of Major League Baseball annual home run leaders
 List of Major League Baseball annual runs batted in leaders
 List of members of the Baseball Hall of Fame

References

External links
 

 Duke Snider Biography at Baseball Biography
 Snider's page @ Baseball Almanac.com

1926 births
2011 deaths
United States Navy personnel of World War II
Baseball players from Los Angeles
Brooklyn Dodgers players
Compton High School alumni
Fort Worth Cats players
Los Angeles Dodgers announcers
Los Angeles Dodgers players
Los Angeles Dodgers scouts
Major League Baseball broadcasters
Major League Baseball center fielders
Major League Baseball players with retired numbers
Minor league baseball managers
Montreal Expos announcers
Montreal Expos coaches
Montreal Royals players
National Baseball Hall of Fame inductees
National League All-Stars
National League home run champions
National League RBI champions
New York Mets players
Newport News Dodgers players
Sportspeople from Escondido, California
San Diego Padres announcers
San Francisco Giants players
Spokane Indians managers
St. Paul Saints (AA) players
Writers from Los Angeles
American people convicted of tax crimes